Vilde Marie Zeiner (born July 7, 1999) is a Norwegian actress.

Career
Her first role as an actress was as Sonja in the film Reisen til julestjernen, which premiered on November 9, 2012.

Filmography
2012: Reisen til julestjernen as Sonja
2016: Costa del Kongsvik, season 2

References

External links

1999 births
21st-century Norwegian actresses
People from Asker
Norwegian film actresses
Norwegian television actresses
Living people